Spas-Lom is a rural locality (a village) in Yugskoye Rural Settlement, Cherepovetsky District, Vologda Oblast, Russia. The population was 49 as of 2002.

Geography 
Spas-Lom is located 72 km southeast of Cherepovets (the district's administrative centre) by road. Novinka is the nearest rural locality.

References 

Rural localities in Cherepovetsky District